The 1981 Eastern Illinois Panthers football team represented Eastern Illinois University as a member of the Association of Mid-Continent Universities during the 1981 NCAA Division I-AA football season, and completed the 80th season of Panther football. The Panthers were led by fourth-year head coach Darrell Mudra and played their home games at O'Brien Stadium in Charleston, Illinois.

Schedule

References

Eastern Illinois
Eastern Illinois Panthers football seasons
Eastern Illinois Panthers football
Association of Mid-Continent Universities football champion seasons